Paracuellos de la Ribera is a municipality located in the province of Zaragoza, Aragon, Spain. According to the 2010 census the municipality has a population of 194 inhabitants.

This town is located at the feet of the Sierra de Vicort range close to the Carretera Nacional N-II highway.

See also
Comunidad de Calatayud
List of municipalities in Zaragoza

References

External links

Paracuellos de la Ribera - CAI Tourism of Aragon

Municipalities in the Province of Zaragoza